Dalgarno is a surname. Notable people with the surname include:

Alexander Dalgarno (1928–2015), British physicist and astronomer
Anne Dalgarno (1909–1980), Australian politician
Brad Dalgarno (born 1967), Canadian ice hockey player 
George Dalgarno (1616–1687), Scottish linguist
Joel Dalgarno (born 1987), Canadian lacrosse player
Lynn Dalgarno (born 1935), Australian geneticist
Roy Dalgarno (1910–2001), Australian artist

See also
6941 Dalgarno, main-belt asteroid
Shine-Dalgarno sequence, named for co-discoverer Lynn Dalgarno
Dalgarno v Hannah, court case